Vraja Mandal Parikrama, also called Braj Yatra (Braj pilgrimage), is a Hindu pilgrimage related to Krishna with the circumambulation of 84 kos Vraja region (Braj) which takes 1 to 2 months depending on the route and speed of travel on foot. The Nimbarka Sampradaya tradition Vaishnava Nagaji Maharaj only performed 84 crore Vraja Parikrama 530 years ago. Since this is a site associated with the vedic era Lord Krishna and mahabharata, it is an important place of pilgrimage for Hindus. It is one of 3 main pilgrimage sites related to "Krishna" circuit, namely "48 kos parikrama of Kurukshetra" in Haryana state, "Braj parikarma" in Mathura in Uttar Pradesh state and "Dwarka parkarma" (Dwarkadish yatra) at Dwarkadhish Temple in Gujarat state.

Braj pilgrimage circuit
Braj Yatra circuit of pilgrimage was formally established by the 16th century sadhus of vaishnava sampradaya with fixed routes, itinerary and rituals. The circuit covers is spread across 2500 km2 area with 84 kos or 300 km long periphery extending 10 km to east and 50 km to north and west. Braj has two main types of pilgrimage circuits, the traditional longer "Braj Yatra" encompassing the whole circuit, and the other shorter significantly modified contemporary point-to-point pilgrimage to visit the main sites at Mathura, Vrindavan, Gokul, Govardhan. The former, longer traditional pilgrimage route, also includes additional sacred sites Nandgaon and Barsana with travel on foot. The origin of the Vraj Mandal Parikrama is variously ascribed to Sri Nagaji of the Nimbarka Sampradaya and Sri Narayana Bhatta of Unchagaon or Varsana (Barsana), of the 16th century, who wrote complete guidebooks of the Yatras.

The largest groups (5,000-20,000 people) at present which conduct the Braj Mandal Parikrama Yatra include the Radharani Braj Yatra of Ramesh Baba, Barsana, Kathia Baba Ashram Yatra, Vallabh Sampradaya Yatra and others.

Vraja Dham

Vana
There are twelve vanas in the Vraja Mandal. Madhuvan, Talavan, Kumudvan, Bahulavan, Kamavan, Khadiravan, Vrindavan, Bhadravan, Bhandiravan, Belvan, Lohavan.

Mahavana and Upavana

There are twelve Mahavanas in Vraja Mandala. There are twelve Upavanas in Vraja Mandala. Namely, Gokul, Govardhan, Barsana, Nandagram, Sanket, Paramadra, Aring, Sessai, Mat, Uchagram, Kelvan, Sri Kund, Gandharvavan, Parsoli, Bilchhu, Bacchavan, Adibadri, Karahla, Ajnokh, Pisaya, Kokilavan, Dadhigram, Kotvan and Raval.

Kunda
There are twelve kundas in Vraja Mandala; namely, Govinda Kunda, Lalita Kunda, Radha Kunda, Shyam Kunda, Davanal Kunda, Shantanu Kunda, Bilol Kunda.

Sarovara
There are twelve sarovaras in Vraja Mandala namely Kusum Sarobar, Prem Sarobar

Nimbarka Sampradaya 
In the Nimbarka Paramapara Sri Nagaji Maharaj, who was born in Paigaon, Mathura district - introduced Vraja Parikrama(circumambulation of 84 Krosha Vraja Dham, the eternal playground of Lord Sri Krishna with His cowherds and Gopis) continuing since the last 530 years.

Kathia Baba Ashram 
A branch of the Nimbarka Sampradaya, the Kathia Baba ka Sthaan, Vrindaban, Gurukul Marg conducts one of the biggest Yatras of only Sadhu Sants The yatra continues for 42 days and does not charge a penny for fooding and lodging from the Sadhus.

See also
 Religious
 48 kos parikrama of Kurukshetra
 Dwarka
 Hindu pilgrimage sites in India
 Famous Hindu yatras
 List of Hindu festivals
 Padayatra
 Ratha Yatra
 Tirtha
 Tirtha and Kshetra

 Regional
 Braj language
 Vajji, the ancient region of the Vṛji janapada that Bajjika evolved from

 Vedic era
 King Kuru
 Cemetery H culture
 Painted Grey Ware culture

References

Hindu pilgrimage sites in India
Brij